The Bitstream International Character Set (BICS) was developed by Bitstream, Inc.

Code charts

Character set 0x00 

� Not in Unicode

Character set 0x01

Character set 0x02

Character set 0x03

Character set 0x04

Character set 0x05

Character set 0x07

Character set 0x08

Character set 0x0A

Character set 0x0B

Character set 0x0D

Character set 0x0E

Character set 0x11

Character set 0x12

Character set 0x13

Character set 0x14

Character set 0x15

Character set 0x19

References 

Character sets